Rhodopinini is a tribe of longhorn beetles of the subfamily Lamiinae. It was described by Gressitt in 1951.

Taxonomy
 Cristorhodopina Breuning, 1966
 Microrhodopis Breuning, 1957
 Pseudorhodopis Breuning, 1940
 Rhodopina Gressitt, 1951

References

Lamiinae